John Leslie Cant (20 February 1908 – 19 June 1943) was an English professional footballer who played as a goalkeeper in the Football League for Southport.

Personal life
Son of Thomas and Mary Ann Cant, Cant was married with a wife Ella, and served as a lance corporal in the Durham Light Infantry (DLI) during the Second World War, having enlisted after employment at a steel works. While serving with the 16th Battalion, DLI, part of the 46th Infantry Division, he was severely wounded, losing limbs, by an explosion during the final stages of the Tunisian campaign and died of wounds nine weeks later on 19 June 1943. He is buried at Bone War Cemetery, Annaba.

Career statistics

References

1908 births
1943 deaths
Military personnel from County Durham
Footballers from County Durham
Association football goalkeepers
English footballers
English Football League players
Trimdon Grange F.C. players
Birtley Town F.C. players
Consett A.F.C. players
Eden Colliery Welfare F.C. players
Leadgate Park F.C. players
Shotton Colliery Welfare F.C. players
Crook Town A.F.C. players
York City F.C. players
Chester-le-Street Town F.C. players
Bury F.C. players
Stockport County F.C. players
Southport F.C. players
Northwich Victoria F.C. players
Gateshead United F.C. players
British Army personnel killed in World War II
Durham Light Infantry soldiers
English amputees